Alliance Bank Malaysia Berhad, often known as Alliance Bank, is a publicly traded banking and financial institution in Malaysia. It offers a comprehensive range of banking and financial solutions to customers of all segments.

See also
List of banks
List of banks in Malaysia

References

External links
Alliance Bank Malaysia Berhad
Alliance Islamic Bank Berhad
BizSmart® Solution
#SupportLokal

1958 establishments in Malaya
Banks of Malaysia